Kristian Böhnlein (born 10 May 1990) is a German professional footballer who plays as a midfielder for 1. FC Schweinfurt 05.

Career
Böhnlein made his professional debut for 1860 Munich on 19 August 2018, appearing in the first round of the 2018–19 DFB-Pokal against 2. Bundesliga side Holstein Kiel, which finished as a 1–3 home loss.

He signed for 1. FC Schweinfurt 05 in the summer of 2020.

Honours
Regionalliga Bayern: 2019–21

References

External links
 
 

1990 births
Living people
People from Kronach (district)
Sportspeople from Upper Franconia
Footballers from Bavaria
German footballers
Association football midfielders
Hamburger SV II players
SpVgg Greuther Fürth II players
SpVgg Bayreuth players
TSV 1860 Munich players
TSV 1860 Munich II players
1. FC Schweinfurt 05 players
Regionalliga players
3. Liga players
Oberliga (football) players